El Grito de la Juventud is a 1939  Argentine comedy drama film directed by Brazilian director Raul Roulien.  The film premiered in Buenos Aires on 24 September 1939 and starred Vicente Climent.

Cast 
 Vicente Climent
 Lalo Malcolm
 Conchita Montenegro
 Raul Roulien
 Alberto Terrones

External links 
 

1939 films
1930s Spanish-language films
Argentine black-and-white films
1939 comedy-drama films
Argentine comedy-drama films
1930s Argentine films